Time in Yemen is given by Arabia Standard Time (AST) (UTC+03:00). Yemen does not currently observe daylight saving time.

References